This article concentrates on server administration in the context of computer gaming. For generic server administration, see system administrator. For the Dell OpenManage Server Administrator product see OpenManage.
A server administrator, or admin has the overall control of a server. This is usually in the context of a business organization, where a server administrator oversees the performance and condition of multiple servers in the business organization, or it can be in the context of a single person running a game server.

The Server Administrator's role is to design, install, administer, and optimize company servers and related components to achieve high performance of the various business functions supported by the servers as necessary. This includes ensuring the availability of client/server applications, configuring all new implementations, and developing processes and procedures for ongoing management of the server environment. Where applicable, the Server Administrator will assist in overseeing the physical security, integrity, and safety of the data center/server farm.

Servers (computing)